A number of cutaneous conditions can occur on the skin and appear to move or migrate through the skin.

See also 
List of conditions associated with café au lait macules
List of contact allergens
List of cutaneous conditions associated with increased risk of nonmelanoma skin cancer
List of cutaneous conditions associated with internal malignancy
List of cutaneous conditions caused by mutations in keratins
List of cutaneous neoplasms associated with systemic syndromes
List of cutaneous conditions caused by problems with junctional proteins
List of dental abnormalities associated with cutaneous conditions
List of genes mutated in cutaneous conditions
List of genes mutated in pigmented cutaneous lesions
List of histologic stains that aid in diagnosis of cutaneous conditions
List of human leukocyte antigen alleles associated with cutaneous conditions
List of immunofluorescence findings for autoimmune bullous conditions
List of inclusion bodies that aid in diagnosis of cutaneous conditions
List of keratins expressed in the human integumentary system
List of radiographic findings associated with cutaneous conditions
List of specialized glands within the human integumentary system
List of spiders associated with cutaneous reactions
List of target antigens in pemphigoid
List of target antigens in pemphigus
List of verrucous carcinoma subtypes
List of xanthoma variants associated with hyperlipoproteinemia subtypes

References 

 
 

Dermatology-related lists
Cutaneous conditions